J. Walter Green (born November 27, 1964) is an American attorney who served as the United States Attorney for the Middle District of Louisiana from 2013 to 2017.

See also
2017 dismissal of U.S. attorneys

References

1964 births
Living people
United States Attorneys for the Middle District of Louisiana
Louisiana Democrats
Louisiana State University alumni
Tulane University Law School alumni